Devizes White Horse, officially known as the Devizes Millennium White Horse, is a chalk hill figure of a horse located on Bank Field, an escarpment at Roundway Hill, on the outskirts of the town of Devizes above the hamlet of Roundway, Wiltshire, England; it is about ½mile north of Roundway. It was cut in 1999 to celebrate the forthcoming third millennium, and is based on a design of another white horse hill figure, which was also known as Devizes White Horse, or sometimes The Snobs Horse, which was very close to the present horse as it was also on Roundway Hill beneath the Oliver's Castle hill fort. Traces of the Snobs Horse can still be seen under the right conditions.

The horse, although sometimes viewed from an skewed angle when on nearby roads, can be seen from miles away, including from Bratton Castle on Bratton Downs, home to Westbury White Horse. It is also visible from the Vale of Pewsey, home to the Pewsey White Horse, where Devizes White Horse and Alton Barnes White Horse can be seen facing each other.

Origins and history

Original Devizes White Horse

In 1845, local shoemakers cut a white horse into the west side of Roundway Hill, directly beneath the hill fort, Oliver's Castle. This was a good location for a hill figure, as it overlooked the valley on a steep slope about 600' above sea level, and could be seen from many miles away. It was known locally as the "Snobs Horse", the word "snobs" derived from the local word for shoemaker. It was fitting to cut a hill figure of a horse, as by its cutting date in 1845, there were already white horse hill figures visible in 1845 in Wiltshire at Westbury, Alton Barnes, Hackpen, Cherhill, near Inkpen, Marlborough and possibly at Broad Town, whose horse has an unknown origin but probably from the 19th century, and Rockley, whose horse was 'discovered' in 1945, prior to which it had resided under grass. Most of them still exist today, the exceptions being those at Inkpen and Rockley. The Devizes horse was neglected and was lost in about 1922, and no dimensions of the horse seem to have ever existed. However, different colouration of the grass could be seen.

In 1954, James Smith, the head boy of the Devizes Grammar School of the time, was out cycling and believed he saw the outline of a horse on the Oliver Cromwell promontory. His observations were checked and indeed there was the faint outline of the head, neck and rump of a horse to be seen. This was the old Snobs Horse. A sketch of the design of the horse was drawn and was later used for the design of the modern 1999 Devizes Millennium White Horse, except reversed, as the Millennium White Horse faces the right (the only white horse in Wiltshire to do so), whilst the Snobs Horse sketch faced left. Attempts to remake the figure at this point in 1954 were unsuccessful, as were previous attempts in 1909, 1939 when the horse was also reported to be seen, 1977, 1987 and finally 1998 when its head and neck reappeared.

In 1979, freak lighting conditions and fine snow brought the outline of the horse's neck and head into view for the first time since 1954. The head and neck have been seen regularly since, including in 1998, 2000 and 2005, the latter two times were since the creation of the Millennium White Horse. Whenever any part of it has reappeared it seems to suggest the horse was small, and roughly half the size of the Millennium White Horse. The reason for its regular reappearances is due to its method of construction, trenching, which is by far the most common method of hill figure construction. The underlying chalk was not near the surface so a trench was dug and chalk from another site was used to fill the trench. The reason this method of construction has led to the Snobs Horse occasionally revealing itself, is because trenching is invasive in the hillside and allows traces of the figure to be seen even when the figure has been overgrown for many years.

Devizes Millennium White Horse

In 1998, a newcomer to Devizes, Sarah Padwick, who was presumably inspired by the other seven current white horses in Wiltshire, sent a letter to a local newspaper that there should be a white horse cut on Roundway Hill to celebrate the millennium. She was unaware of the very nearby Snobs Horse. The newspaper liked the idea and plans followed suit. Originally, the plan was to recut the Snobs Horse in its original location (the aforementioned 1998 attempt). This plan was unsuccessful due to the site being declared a Site of Special Scientific Interest. However a local farmer, Chris Combe, offered his part of land on Roundway Hill as an alternative site, provided permission was granted by the Crown Estates Commissioners, who own the land. Wiltshire County Council Tourism supported the project as did Roundway Parish Council who supported the planning application made to the Kennet District Council. This became the new location of the horse. The design of the horse was James Smith' design from 1954 except reversed so the horse faced right. The design was also a horse depicted as moving (the other Wiltshire White Horses are in a standing position).

A committee was set up to oversee the project, the 'Cavaliers of the Devizes Millennium White Horse', and members of the public were invited to join. The group was also formed to support its future maintenance. Alan Truscott, of Sarsens Housing, joined the committee as the member in charge of the surveying and pegging out of the figure of the horse on the hill, alongside did Keith Saunders of Pearce Civil Engineering, who joined to provide the machinery and manpower to complete the clearing of the top soil and the infilling of the chalk following the cutting of the outline, the cutting of which was done by hand by various groups and individuals from the local community. Two hundred people helped cut the figure. It was anticipated that this project will promote Devizes, its ancient heritage and the attractive countryside surrounding it, as well as to be an additional feature to the tourist map of the area.

The digging of the outline of the horse occurred over the weekend of 18/19 September 1999. The 200 people cutting were asked to dig one metre in length, the total length of the horse being 230m approx. On 20 September, the site became closed so that the sponsors of Pearce Civil Engineering could dig out the body of the horse for some several days. They also positioned the rocks used as the horse's eye and nostril. Devizes White Horse was completed on 29 September 1999.

Scouring and maintenance
Devizes White Horse has occasionally fallen into states of disrepair, with the main threat to the site being the growth of weeds. A Beckhampton local, comparing the state of the Devizes horse in 2007 to the then-recently cleaned Westbury White Horse, was quoted by the Gazette and Herald as saying: "What a shame that the civic pride which led to this White Horse being created to celebrate the Millennium does not seem to have lasted longer than the first couple of years of that Millennium." Subsequently, the first major clean-up, or scouring of the horse occurred over a two-day period in April 2007, in which Padwick invited volunteers to join forces and remove weeds, grasses and moss from the horse.

By September 2008, the horse had again become barely visible. The Devizes Millennium White Horse Committee began seeking funds to scour the horse. These scouring plans were then passed to the Probation Service Community Service Group who subsequently thoroughly cleaned the horse, a task they have been since repeated regularly. In August 2014, a writer for the Wiltshire Times complained about the then-current condition of the horse, bemoaning the badly overgrown chalk surface and how the horse appeared "grey and blotchy from a distance. Usually, in the dry of summer, the chalk looks lovely and white," as well as noting how "the gravel pathway leading to the mobility gate [was] so overgrown that no wheel or pushchair could go through to the seat in the field." The writer hoped Roundway Parish Council "would consider some urgent maintenance."

Modern history

Devizes White Horse is affectionately nicknamed "Chalkie" by locals. Shortly after Devizes White Horse's completion, it was included alongside the other seven canonical Wiltshire white horses on the 90-mile walking tour 'Wiltshire's White Horse Trail', better known as simply the White Horse Trail, which visits all eight of the canonical white horses in Wiltshire. The tour was established in 2000 by the Wiltshire Tourism board. Padwick praised the trail, writing that "A lot of people are interested in doing recreational activities like this and taking on lesser and greater degrees of walking." Since 2006, Devizes White Horse has been the start point for an annual charity event known as the White Horse Challenge, where participants tour the full 52-mile walk around the eight canonical Wiltshire white horses to raise money for Wiltshire Air Ambulance.

The horse featured at the centre of the logo for Roundway Parish Council, who were uncomfortable with Roundway being mistaken for "a mere adjacent for Devizes," and launched the logo for Roundway in 2011 to help distinguish the settlement from Devizes. Roundway Parish Council merged with Devizes Town Council in 2017, although Roundway's last chairman, Chris Callow, spoke proudly of the Roundway parish council's achievements, including helping with the cutting of Devizes White Horse. Peter Greed, who designed the millennium horse, died after a long period of sickness in November 2008 at the age of 73, and is commemorated with a plaque on the entrance gate to Bank Field.

Celebrations

Further celebrating the millennium, a time capsule was buried beneath the horse on 31 December 1999, with help from Pearce Civil Engineering, and the horse was floodlit the same night from dusk into the dawn of 1 January 2000. The time capsule, co-donated by Wessex Water, was full of oddities of local interest, while the floodlighting of the horse could be seen from miles back. The horse was lit up again on 30 June 2012 when, as part of the Ageas Salisbury International Arts Festival, both Devizes White Horse and the nearby Alton Barnes White Horse were illuminated by lantern parades. Over 300 lanterns were placed around the Devizes horse and it was lit from 10pm to 12am.

On 10 October 2009, to celebrate the horse's tenth anniversary, locals walked onto the horse, including the Mayor of Devizes, to form a human "10" figure. A light aircraft from GS Aviation flew over the "10" figure to take an aerial photograph of it. To celebrate the 13th birthday of the horse in autumn 2012, local residents Thelma and Colin Edwards decided to stage a picnic on the hill, inviting local community members and others who were involved in the cutting of the horse. The ceremony was hosted by Sarah Padwick as well as Kelvin Nash, the Mayor of Devizes, and also involved children bringing flowers to create a garland for the white horse's neck. A scout group in Devizes celebrated St. George's Day in 2017 by sprucing up and weeding the white horse.

Replica
To celebrate its 10th anniversary in 2012, Nursteed School in Devizes unveiled a small replica of the Millennium Horse on its grounds. This horse was constructed over a period of months by volunteers, including staff and students, and is a tenth the size of the original. A small number 10 was initially placed on the horse, resembling the human "10" figure that volunteers formed on the original millennium white horse in 2009 to celebrate its tenth birthday.

See also
List of hill figures in Wiltshire

Other white horses

Miles are road distances from a road near Roundway Hill Covert.
Alton Barnes White Horse (7 road miles away using Horton Road)
Broad Town White Horse (15.2 road miles away)
Cherhill White Horse (10 road miles away using the A361)
Hackpen White Horse (14.7 road miles away)
Kilburn White Horse (North Yorkshire) (256 miles away)
Litlington White Horse (East Sussex) (147.7 road miles away)
Marlborough White Horse (14.2 road miles away)
Osmington White Horse (Dorset) (70.2 road miles away)
Pewsey White Horse (14.2 road miles away)
Uffington White Horse (Oxfordshire) (30.2 road miles away)
Westbury White Horse (14.3 road miles away)
Woolbury White Horse (36.4 miles away)

Other hill figures
Bulford Kiwi (21.5 road miles away)
Cerne Abbas Giant (58.5 road miles away)
Fovant Badges (31 road miles away)
Lamb Down Military Badge (20.2 road miles away)
Solsbury Hill turf maze (19.5 road miles away)
The Mizmaze (43.2 road miles away)

References

White horses (hill figures) in England
Buildings and structures completed in 1845
1845 establishments in England
History of Wiltshire
Protected areas of Wiltshire
Buildings and structures celebrating the third millennium
Devizes
Tourist attractions in Wiltshire